ASQ can refer to several things:

Airports and airlines 
 ExpressJet
 Atlantic Southeast Airlines' ICAO airline code
 International Air Transport Association airport code for Austin Airport, Nevada, United States

Arts 
 Alexander String Quartet based at San Francisco State University
 Australian String Quartet

Questionnaires 
 Ages & Stages Questionnaires (ASQ) - A way to screen infants and young children for developmental delays during the crucial first 5 years of life. See Developmental-Behavioral Screening and Surveillance#Challenges to Early Detection in Primary Care
 Attributional Style Questionnaire, a self-report instrument that yields scores for explanatory style
 Autism Spectrum Quotient, a questionnaire designed to measure autistic traits

Other 
 Allowable Sale Quantity - Used in forestry analysis
 Administrative Science Quarterly - an academic journal on organization studies
 American Society for Quality
 Auctioned Seasonal Quota - individual quotas for a season and not forever, sold in open auctions
 Australia Square - an office and retail complex in the central business district of Sydney, Australia.
 Azerbaijani Armed Forces - the military of Azerbaijan